The following United States Army units and commanders fought in the Battle of Cross Keys of the American Civil War. The Confederate order of battle is listed separately.

Abbreviations used

Military rank
 MG = Major General
 BG = Brigadier General
 Col = Colonel
 Ltc = Lieutenant Colonel
 Maj = Major
 Cpt = Captain

Union Forces Near Cross Keys
MG John C. Frémont

Mountain Department
MG John C. Frémont

Department of the Rappahannock (formerly I Corps, Army of the Potomac)
MG Irvin McDowell (not present)

References
 June 8, 1862 - Battle of Cross Keys, Va. The War of the Rebellion: A Compilation of the Official Records of the Union and Confederate Armies. United States War Department.  Volume XII, Chapter XXIV, pp. 664–682.  (1885)

American Civil War orders of battle